The pink cusk-eel, Genypterus blacodes, is a demersal species of cusk-eel found in the oceans around southern Australia, Chile, Brazil, and around New Zealand except the east coast of Northland, in depths of .

This species has a pinkish yellow body marbled with irregular reddish brown blotches dorsally, with no dorsal spines or anal spines.

Other names in English include ling, Australian rockling, New Zealand ling, kingklip, pink ling, and northern ling.  The South African kingklip is a similar, related species (Genypterus capensis).

This species feeds on crustaceans such as Munida and scampi but also takes fish. It has been caught on the bottom during the spawning season of the blue grenadier (Macruronus novaezelandiae) while feeding on the species. Juveniles of this species are found in shallower shelf waters. This species is oviparous, and its eggs float on the surface in a pelagic mass.

In the month-long NORFANZ Expedition of 2003 which was examining the biodiversity of the seamounts and slopes of the Norfolk Ridge near New Zealand, a single specimen weighing  was collected. 

It is utilized fresh, frozen or smoked, and can be fried or baked.

References

 
 
 Tony Ayling & Geoffrey Cox, Collins Guide to the Sea Fishes of New Zealand,  (William Collins Publishers Ltd, Auckland, New Zealand 1982) 

Ophidiidae
Fish of the Pacific Ocean
Fish described in 1801
Taxa named by Johann Reinhold Forster